Harpalus fulvus is a species of ground beetle in the subfamily Harpalinae. It was described by the French entomologist Pierre François Marie Auguste Dejean in 1829.

References

fulvus
Beetles described in 1829